Thomas "Tommy" Swarbrigg and John James "Jimmy" Swarbrigg are Irish music promoters and former pop musicians. As The Swarbriggs, they represented Ireland at the 1975 Eurovision Song Contest with "That's What Friends Are For". The brothers wrote both songs. They also scored numerous other top 20 chart hit singles in Ireland during the 1970s, including "Joanne" (a No. 1 hit in 1976), "Looking Through The Eyes Of A Beautiful Girl", "If Ma Could See Me Now", "Funny" and many more. They had over 20 top 20 Chart Entries through the 1970s, which were all self composed.

From 1962, Tommy played trumpet with Joe Dolan's showband, The Drifters (not to be confused with the American group).  In 1969 he and the other backing musicians left to form The Times Showband, with Jimmy added as lead vocalist.  The brothers wrote their own compositions, which was unusual for a showband, and they scored numerous hit singles in Ireland.  By 1973 they had their own television show on Raidió Teilifís Éireann and worked independently of the showband, leaving altogether in 1975. They retired in 1980 and In later years they had various business ventures, including promoting concerts in Ireland for various Irish and foreign artists, including Smokie, Leo Sayer, Meatloaf (3 tours) The (American) Drifters, Jack L, Albert Hammond, Dermot Morgan, and Richie Kavanagh. The brothers were attributed as the inspiration for the 'My Lovely Horse' music video in the channel 4 television series Father Ted.

The re-written song of The Swarbriggs "If Ma Could See Me Now" was later heard from the 2002–2008 Mrs Brown's Boys direct-to-video film series in Ireland.

References
Swarbrigg Entertainment official site as music promoters
From Ian Gallagher's showbands site:
Swarbriggs
Times Showband
Drifters
From Irish-showbands.com:
The Drifters (1964-1980's)
The Times (1968-1982)

Eurovision Song Contest entrants for Ireland
Eurovision Song Contest entrants of 1975
Eurovision Song Contest entrants of 1977
Irish pop music groups
Musical groups from County Cavan
Irish trumpeters